Alburnus zagrosensis is a species of cyprinid fish in the genus Alburnus.  It is endemic to the Karun River basin in Iran.

References

zagrosensis
Endemic fauna of Iran
Fish described in 2009